DXMM (102.5 FM), broadcasting as 102.5 Brigada News FM, is a radio station owned and operated by Brigada Mass Media Corporation. The station's studio is located at Suan Arcade, Mastersons Ave., Ilaya Carmen, Cagayan de Oro, while its transmitter is located at the 5th floor, CFI Bldg., Tiano-Yacapin St., Cagayan de Oro.

References

Radio stations in Cagayan de Oro
Radio stations established in 2014
2014 establishments in the Philippines